Bangladesh Armed Services Board is a Bangladesh government body under the Ministry of Defence responsible for the welfare of serving and retired military personnel. The chairman of the board is Golam Md Hasibul Alam, the defence secretary of Bangladesh. Brigadier General Mohammad Kamrul Hasan is the present director of the Board. The Director of the Bangladesh Armed Services Board also sits on the Board of Directors of Sena Kalyan Sangstha.

History 
The British Raj established the Soldiers, Sailors and Airmens Board to look after the welfare of retired and serving personnel in India. After the Partition of India it was renamed to Pakistan Armed Services Board which was renamed to Bangladesh Armed Services Board after the Independence of Bangladesh in 1971. Under the Bangladesh Armed Services Board are various District Armed Services Board based in different regions of Bangladesh. There are a total of 20 district boards.

The boards channels funds from Royal Commonwealth Ex-Services League to former soldiers who served in the British colonial army and their widows. There are 11 former personnel and 149 widows of former personnels receiving fund from the British government through the league.

References 

1972 establishments in Bangladesh
Organisations based in Dhaka
Government agencies of Bangladesh
Government departments of Bangladesh
Ministry of Defence (Bangladesh)